Ugochi Desire Oparanozie  (born 17 December 1993) is a Nigerian footballer who plays as a forward in the Chinese Women's Super League for Wuhan Jianghan University and the Nigerian national team.

Club career

Oparanozie started her career at Bayelsa Queens in the Nigerian Women's Championship and moved to Delta Queens in 2010. She then spent 2 months on loan at Düvenciler Lisesispor in the Turkish Women's First Football League in 2011, before returning to Delta Queens.

In 2012, she joined Rossiyanka from the Russian Women's Football Championship, with them she played four matches at the 2012–13 UEFA Women's Champions League, scoring one goal.

Oparanozie joined Bundesliga club VfL Wolfsburg for the 2013–14 season signing a two-year contract. In the first half of the season, she only appeared in one game, and mostly played for Wolfsburg's second team. In the winter, after half a season, she left Wolfsburg. On 21 February 2014, Oparanozie transferred to Ataşehir Belediyespor to play the second half of the season in the Turkish Women's First Football League.

Guingamp
For the 2014–15 she joined Guingamp of the French Division 1 Féminine, where she was joined by Nigerian international captain Evelyn Nwabuoku during the following season.

Ahead of the 2019–20 season, Oparanozie was named club captain and began her leadership reign well with a win over Metz on the opening day of the season.

On 30 June 2020, Dijon FCO announced that She had signed a 2-year contract.

After leaving Guingamp, a bus-stop has been named after Oparanozie in Guingamp by her fans after her long stay at the French football club.

Wuhan Jianghan University
Oparanozie joined Chinese Women's Super League club Wuhan Jianghan University for the 2022 season.

International career
As a junior international she scored 2 goals in the 2010 FIFA U-20 Women's World Cup and 3 goals in the 2012 tournament.

Oparanozie has been a regular member of the Nigerian national team since 2010, participating in the FIFA Women's World Cup tournaments of 2011, 2015, and 2019.

In April 2019, she was named the new captain of Nigeria by coach Thomas Dennerby who praised Oparanozie for her 'discipline and good character'.

Following the 2019 FIFA Women's World Cup, in her role as captain, she led calls for equal pay in Nigerian football citing disparity with the bonuses received by the team's male counterparts.

She has also been part of the Nigerian squads of the African Women's Championship of 2010 and 2014, 2016 and 2018,  winning all four tournaments. She scored crucial goals in both the 2014 and 2016 finals.

Honours

International
Nigeria
 African Women's Championship: 2010, 2014,  2016, 2018

Individual
 2014 African Women's Championship : Golden Boot

Club
Delta Queens
 Nigerian Women's Championship: 2011, 2012

References

External links
 
 
 
 Player stats in France  at statsfootofeminin.fr

Living people
1993 births
Nigerian women's footballers
Nigeria women's international footballers
2011 FIFA Women's World Cup players
2015 FIFA Women's World Cup players
WFC Rossiyanka players
VfL Wolfsburg (women) players
Ataşehir Belediyespor players
Women's association football forwards
Division 1 Féminine players
En Avant Guingamp (women) players
People from Owerri
2019 FIFA Women's World Cup players
Frauen-Bundesliga players
Nigerian expatriate women's footballers
Nigerian expatriate sportspeople in Turkey
Expatriate women's footballers in Turkey
Nigerian expatriate sportspeople in Russia
Expatriate women's footballers in Russia
Nigerian expatriate sportspeople in Germany
Expatriate women's footballers in Germany
Nigerian expatriate sportspeople in France
Expatriate women's footballers in France
Delta Queens F.C. players
Bayelsa Queens F.C. players
Dijon FCO (women) players
Sportspeople from Imo State